The Vauxhall Big 6 is a name given to a series of automobiles which was produced by Vauxhall in the United Kingdom from 1934 to 1940. Rolling chassis were also bodied in Australia.

Model BX/BY and BXL
Based on a lengthened  version of the Vauxhall Cadet the new car had a conventional chassis with semi-elliptical leaf springs all round and Vauxhall-Lovejoy hydraulic dampers. Wire -spoked wheels were fitted. Compared with the Cadet, the engine was mounted further forwards. To satisfy the demand for larger coach-built bodies the BXL model was a long wheelbase  version. Two engines were offered, both six cylinder. The larger engine with a tax horsepower rating of 27 had a capacity of 3180cc and was based on the VY Cadet but with an improved cylinder head and 5.6:1 compression ratio. It had a bore of 81 mm and stroke of 95 mm. The smaller 20 hp, 2393cc had a reduced bore of 73mm and produced 52 bhp at 3900rpm. The power was transmitted to the rear axle via a single-plate clutch to a 4-speed gearbox, with “silent third” and synchromesh on 3rd & 4th gears. Twelve volt electrics were fitted.

An unusual feature unique to the Big Six was the “Pedomatic” starting system. To start the car the accelerator pedal had to be depressed which switched on the starter motor. After the engine started the vacuum in the inlet manifold disengaged the starter motor. The style of the vehicle (especially its grille) was based on the American Chevrolet Master.

The factory standard six light saloon was well fitted out with leather upholstery and lots of wood trimmings. All the windows used "Triplex" toughened glass. Other bodies which appeared in Vauxhall's own brochure included the "Hurlingham" coupé built by Grosvenor, and the Rye cabriolet, and Denton and Romney coupés by Martin Walker. In 1934 a 7-seater "Newmarket" saloon was added to the range. 1935 saw several changes including a re-designed radiator grille painted in body colour, the spare wheel mounted on the wing got a cover and the front seats were redesigned. The chassis was also supplied to external coachbulders including Salmons.

The launch price for the standard saloon was GBP325 and the most expensive car in the range, the long-wheelbase limousine was GBP550.

A 27 hp BY was tested by The Motor magazine in 1934 and achieved a top speed of 72 mph and accelerated from 0-60 mph in 28 seconds. Autocar magazine tested a 20 hp BY in 1936 and recorded  0-60 in 36.5 seconds.  They did not record an actual top speed but stated that it would exceed 70 mph.

3788 BY/BX and 796 BXL cars were produced.

Model GY/GL

The GY/GL or Twenty Five replaced the BX/BY in 1937 being first shown at the 1936 London Motor Show. The GL code was for the long wheelbase version. Although the chassis had the same wheelbase options as the outgoing model it was completely new and featured cross-braced spacing members for extra rigidity.  It was the last car chassis to be designed by Vauxhall. Steel wheels replaced the wires and the front suspension was now independent using torsion bars. Lockheed hydraulic brakes with a dual-circuit for safety were used. The engine was extensively altered and its capacity increased to 3215cc. The change was achieved by extending the stroke to 101.6mm and decreasing the bore to 81.9mm the effect of which was to put the car into the lower 25 hp tax bracket. The 4-speed gearbox was carried over and in 1938 gained synchromesh on first gear. Also for 1938 the car came as standard with a heater and the Pedomatic starting system was dropped.

Authorised bodies included a standard saloon by Vauxhall (GBP298), a Tickford foursome coupé (GBP365), Wingham cabriolet by Martin Walker (GBP400), Sports Saloon by Grosvenor (GBP345), Continental saloon by Connaught (GBP498) and Limousine by Grosvenor (GBP575).

A car tested by the Autocar magazine reached 76 mph and accelerated from 0-60 mph in 21.9seconds

6822 were produced when World War 2 stopped production. The car did not re-appear after the war.

References

Big 6
Cars introduced in 1934